My Night at Maud's, also known as My Night with Maud (UK), is a 1969 French New Wave drama film by Éric Rohmer. It is the third film (fourth in order of release) in his series of Six Moral Tales.

Over the Christmas break in a French city, the film shows chance meetings and conversations between four single people, each knowing one of the other three. One man and one woman are Catholics, while the other man and woman are atheists. The discussions and actions of the four continually refer to the thoughts of Blaise Pascal on mathematics, on ethics and on human existence. They also talk about a topic the bachelor Pascal did not cover – love between men and women.

Plot 
Jean-Louis, a solitary and serious engineer, has taken a job in Clermont-Ferrand where he knows nobody. Attending a Catholic church, he sees a young blonde woman and without knowing anything about her is convinced that she will become his wife. In the cafe he encounters Vidal, an old Marxist friend now a university lecturer, who invites him to a concert that evening. Jean-Louis is at first reluctant but eventually agrees to go. After the concert they dine in a restaurant. Vidal has plans to visit a friend the following evening and invites Jean-Louis to accompany him. However, Jean-Louis plans to attend mass. They agree to attend mass together, as Vidal's friend will not be available until after midnight.

They arrive at the flat of Maud, a paediatrician who is recently divorced. The three talk and drink, until Maud suggests that falling snow has made the drive to Jean-Louis' mountain village unsafe and he should stay. Vidal, who had hoped to stay, leaves. Maud and Jean-Louis discuss religion and their love life. She makes herself comfortable in the double bed in the living room and reveals she divorced her husband because he had an affair with a Catholic woman, all the while she herself had a lover who died in a car crash one year ago. When it is time to sleep she declares the bed she is in is the only bed. She gets naked and suggests that Jean-Louis join her under the covers. He eventually does, keeping his clothes on. In the morning he resists her advances to make love. Initially hurt, Maud gets over the rejection and invites him to join her later for a walk in the snow with friends.

Just before meeting Maud's friends, he sees the blonde girl from the church and, much encouraged in his dealings with women by his night with Maud, boldly introduces himself. Her name is Françoise and she agrees to see him in the church. On the walk with Maud he is much more forward with her, to the point where she has to restrain him. After the walk Jean-Louis tries his luck at the place where he met Françoise and she turns out to be there, about to return home. He offers to give her a ride home and learns that she is a biology postgraduate. He goes back with her to her student house and after a tea he can spend the night in a separate room. In the morning, before they go to church, she refuses to kiss him. After the church service she admits that the cloud between them is because she has been having an affair with a married man.

Five years on, now married and on a beach with their child, the two meet Maud. She says she has remarried, but it is not a success. Afterwards, Jean-Louis confesses to Françoise that he came from Maud's bed on the morning he first met her but gives no specifics about what really happened. Then he realizes that his wife's lover was Maud's husband. As they are now both happy together, they decide not to bring up the subject again. Instead, they go for a swim with their child.

Cast 
 Jean-Louis Trintignant as Jean-Louis
 Françoise Fabian as Maud
 Marie-Christine Barrault as Françoise
 Antoine Vitez as Vidal
 Leonid Kogan as himself
 Guy Léger as Preacher
 Anne Dubot as Blonde Friend
 Marie Becker as Marie, Maud's Daughter (uncredited)
 Marie-Claude Rauzier as Student (uncredited)

Production and themes
My Night at Maud's was made with funds raised by François Truffaut, who liked the script, which was initially intended to be the third "Moral Tale". However, because the film takes place on Christmas Eve, Rohmer wanted to shoot the film on and around that day. Actor Jean-Louis Trintignant was not available and the filming was delayed for an entire year.

One of the main themes concerns Pascal's Wager, which Jean-Louis and Vidal discuss. The conversations are directly inspired by an episode of the television series En profil dans le texte called l'Entretien sur Pascal (The interview on Pascal), which was made by Rohmer and included a similar debate between Brice Parain and Dominican Father Dominique Dubarle. The themes of chance and Pascal would be examined by Rohmer in his 1992 film A Tale of Winter.

Reception
When the film was released in France in 1969, it received mixed reviews. Guy Teisseire of L'Aurore wrote that "the best compliment we can pay Éric Rohmer is to have done with My Night at Maud'''s a talking film. I mean the opposite of a talkative film where the text would be used to fill the gaps: that is to say, a work in which eloquent silences are felt as lack of understanding about both is constant". Claude Garson of L'Aurore said that "we do not underestimate the ambition of such a work, but we say right away that film, with its own laws, does not lend itself to such a subject. The theater, or the conference would have better served the purpose of the authors, because such controversies have nothing photogenic, apart from the presence of the beautiful Françoise Fabian and that very good actor Jean-Louis Trintignant". Henry Chapier of Combat called it "a bit stiff and intellectual". Jean Rochereau of La Croix called it "a masterpiece ... whose superb insolence toward everyone excites me and fills me". Jean de Baroncelli of Le Monde wrote that "it is a work that demands from the viewer a minimum of attention and complicity. We find ourselves on the fringes of worries and obsessions of the time: its commitment goes beyond the everyday. Yet this is, in our view, worth the price. ... We are grateful to Eric Rohmer for his haughty, if a little outdated, austerity. The interpretation is brilliant". Penelope Houston wrote that "this is a calm, gravely ironic, finely balanced film, an exceptionally graceful bit of screen architecture whose elegant proportioning is the more alluring because its symmetry doesn't instantly hit the eye".

It was Rohmer's first successful film both commercially and critically. It was screened and highly praised at the 1969 Cannes Film Festival, and later won the Prix Max Ophüls in France. It was released in the US and praised by critics there as well. James Monaco said that "here, for the first time the focus is clearly set on the ethical and existential question of choice. If it isn't clear within Maud'' who actually is making the wager and whether or not they win or lose, that only enlarges the idea of "le pari" ("the bet") into the encompassing metaphor that Rohmer wants for the entire series". Its arthouse theater release in the US was so successful that it got a wider release in regular theaters.

Awards
The film was nominated for the Academy Award for Best Foreign Language Film and Best Original Screenplay and was nominated for the Palme d'Or at the 1969 Cannes Film Festival. It won the 1969 Prix Méliès.

See also
 List of submissions to the 42nd Academy Awards for Best Foreign Language Film
 List of French submissions for the Academy Award for Best Foreign Language Film
 List of Christmas films

References

External links 

 
 
 
My Night at Maud’s: Chances Are . . . an essay by Kent Jones at the Criterion Collection

1969 films
1960s Christmas drama films
1960s Christmas films
Films directed by Éric Rohmer
Films with atheism-related themes
1960s French-language films
Films produced by Barbet Schroeder
French Christmas drama films
1969 drama films
1960s French films